Hendricks County Airport , also known as Gordon Graham Field, is a public airport at 2749 Gordon Graham Blvd. in Danville, a town in Hendricks County, Indiana, United States. Owned by the Indianapolis Airport Authority, it is located 13 miles (21 km) west of the central business district of Indianapolis and serves as a reliever airport for Indianapolis International Airport. The airport is also two miles (3 km) southeast from the center of Danville.

Facilities and aircraft 
For the 12-month period ending December 31, 2019, the airport had 13,431 aircraft operations: 94% general aviation, 2% air taxi and 4% military. In December 2021, there were 60 aircraft based at this airport: 57 single-engine and 3 multi-engine.

References

External links 
 Hendricks County Aviation, LLC, the fixed-base operator (FBO)
 Aerial photos from Indianapolis International Airport
 

Airports in Indiana
Transportation buildings and structures in Hendricks County, Indiana